Eastern Mountain Sports (or EMS) is an outdoor clothing and equipment retailer in the Northeastern United States headquartered in Meriden, Connecticut.

EMS sells outdoor equipment and clothing from both name brands and its own EMS line. The company also has a set of EMS Schools that offer classes in rock and ice climbing, kayaking, stand-up paddle boarding, trekking, and skiing. The EMS Schools headquarters is located in the White Mountains in North Conway, NH; and has other locations near the Adirondacks in NY, etc.

History 
EMS was founded in 1967 in Wellesley, Massachusetts by two camping enthusiasts – Alan McDonough, who was running the family hotel chain, and Roger Furst, a lawyer whose office was in the McDonough complex. They targeted the outdoor equipment market in Boston. The first store on Linden St. in Wellesley carried the Gerry outdoor equipment line as well as downhill skis.

In 1968, the two enterprises merged and built the 1041 Commonwealth Avenue store – at 10,000 sq. ft. McDonough and Furst sold the company in 1979 to The Franklin Mint, which was acquired by Warner Communications in 1981.  Four years later Warner sold the Mint but retained EMS, subsequently selling it to the American Retail Group, owned by the Brenninkmeijer family.

In July 2003 Will Manzer became President and CEO and shifted the company focus back towards specialty outdoors gear.  A new logo, store reorganization, and a shift from stores in shopping malls to freestanding community-based stores followed.

American Retail Group sold Eastern Mountain Sports to investors led by J.H. Whitney & Company in 2004.

Bob Mayerson was announced as new president in March 2010, as Will Manzer continued leading the company.

In 2012, Versa Capital Management bought EMS from J.H. Whitney and Mark Walsh became CEO.  In April 2016, Vestis Retail Group, the Versa Capital-owned unit which owned the Sport Chalet and Bob's Stores sporting goods chains as well as Eastern Mountain, announced it had filed for bankruptcy protection and reorganization under Chapter 11 of the United States Bankruptcy Code.  Vestis said it would reorganize and focus on the operations of Eastern Mountain and Bob's, while all Sport Chalet stores would close.

On 19 April 2017, Sports Direct International plc (Sports Direct) received permission to acquire Bob's Stores and Eastern Mountain Sports following Eastern Outfitters LLC's Chapter 11 filing.

In May 2022, Bob's Stores and Eastern Mountain Sports was acquired by GoDigital Media Group as part of its strategy to generate synergy between content, community and commerce.

References

External links 
 

Companies based in Hillsborough County, New Hampshire
Economy of the Northeastern United States
Sporting goods retailers of the United States
Online retailers of the United States
American companies established in 1967
Retail companies established in 1967
1967 establishments in Massachusetts
Sports Direct
Companies that filed for Chapter 11 bankruptcy in 2016
Companies that filed for Chapter 11 bankruptcy in 2017